Xiannongtan Stadium (Simplified Chinese: 先农坛体育场) is a multi-use stadium in Beijing, China.  It is located in Dongcheng District and is named after Xiannongtan, the Altar of Agriculture, located nearby.  This stadium was built in 1936 and was named Beiping Public Stadium (Simplified Chinese: 北平公共体育场).   It was renovated between November 1986 to September 1988.  The stadium holds 30,000 and is used mainly for football matches.

Footnotes

Football venues in China
Sports venues in Beijing
Venues of the 1990 Asian Games